Shashank or Shashanka is a given name among Hindus. The name is derived from Sanskrit, as another name for the Moon (literally, 'hare-marked", shasha, "hare" + anka, "spotted"). The Hindu god Shiva is also called Shashank Sekhar, meaning "He holds moon on his head".

Notable people with the name include:
Shashanka, 7th-century Hindu Kayastha king who unified Bengal
Shashank Arora (born 1989), Indian actor and musician
Shashank (actor) (born 1979), Indian film actor
Shashank (diplomat), Indian Foreign Secretary from 2003 to 2004
Shashank (director), Indian film director in Kannada movies
Shashanka Ghosh, Indian film director in Hindi and Telugu movies
Shashanka Koirala, Nepalese ophthalmologist and politician
Shashank Manohar, Indian lawyer and former President of the Board of Control for Cricket in India
Shashank Shende, Indian actor, director, and writer
Shashank Vyas, Indian television actor

See also
 Shashankan Mayyanad, stage name of Indian actor, comedian and screenwriter Sangeeth Sasidharan
 Shoshenq, an ancient Egyptian name
 Shawshank

References